Plaza de la Constitución is a public square in the city center of Málaga, Spain.

Notable features

Fuente de Génova (Genoa Fountain): is a sixteenth century marble fountain that has been located in the plaza since 2003.
The Sociedad Económica de Amigos del País (Economic Foundation of the Friends of the Country): an 18th century building that was formerly a maritime consul and later a Jesuit School

History
The plaza has been a major town square since the time of the Reconquista when it was known as "Plaza de las Cuatro Calles" ("Four streets square"). It was also previously known as the Plaza mayor ("Main town square"). In 1812 it was renamed "Plaza de la constitución."

Málaga's city hall was located in the plaza until 1869. Other former occupants of the plaza include: The Casa del Corregidor (Mayor's home), the city jail, the Audiencia, and the convent of the Augustines.

In 2002, the Plaza was transformed into a pedestrian square, along with Málaga's Calle Larios.

Festivals and Events
The plaza is a key location for the Feria de Málaga, which takes place every August, and the Holy Week celebrations in Málaga.

The city of Málaga's traditional New Year's Eve celebration is held in the plaza every year.

References

Málaga
Plazas in Spain
Plazas in Málaga